The Cisco Kid is a 1931 American pre-Code Western film directed by Irving Cummings and starring Warner Baxter. It was produced and distributed by Fox Film Corporation and is a follow up to Fox's hugely successful 1928 In Old Arizona and 1930's The Arizona Kid, both of which had starred Baxter as the same character The Cisco Kid. A copy is preserved at the Library of Congress.

Cast
Warner Baxter as The Cisco Kid
Edmund Lowe as Sergeant Michael Patrick "Mickey" Dunn
Conchita Montenegro as Carmencita
Nora Lane as Sally Benton
Frederick Burt as Sheriff Tex Ransom
Willard Robertson as Enos Hankins
James Bradbury Jr. as Dixon, U.S.A.
John Webb Dillon as Bouse, U.S.A. 
Charles Stevens as Lopez
Douglas Haig as Billy
Marilyn Knowlden as Annie Benton
George Irving as Officer (uncredited)

Plot
The Cisco Kid saves a widow's ranch by robbing a bank. He risks being captured when he erroneously thinks that one of her children has been injured. The local sergeant is so impressed by that concern that he "accidentally" lets Cisco escape.

References

External links
 

Lobby poster(Wayback)

1931 films
Adaptations of works by O. Henry
Films directed by Irving Cummings
Fox Film films
1931 Western (genre) films
American Western (genre) films
Cisco Kid
American black-and-white films
1930s American films